Howard Ronald Drake  (born 13 August 1956) is a British former diplomat who was High Commissioner to Canada from 2013 to 2017. He retired from the Diplomatic Service in August 2017.

Education 

Drake was educated at Churcher's College.

Career 

1981–1983: Vice-Consul Commercial, Los Angeles, United States
1985–1988: Second Secretary Political, Santiago, Chile
early 1990s: Head of Chancery, Singapore
1997–2002: Deputy Consul-General and Director of Inward Investment, New York City, United States
2005–2009: Ambassador to Chile
2010–2013: British High Commissioner to Jamaica
2013–2017: British High Commissioner to Canada

On 14 March 2014, in the midst of the 2014 Crimean crisis, he wrote an op-ed in The Globe and Mail on why his Government thought the Crimean referendum should be cancelled.

Drake was appointed Companion of the Order of St Michael and St George (CMG) in the 2017 Birthday Honours.

References 

Ambassadors of the United Kingdom to Chile
High Commissioners of the United Kingdom to Jamaica
High Commissioners of the United Kingdom to Canada
Officers of the Order of the British Empire
People educated at Churcher's College
1956 births
Living people
Companions of the Order of St Michael and St George
High Commissioners of the United Kingdom to the Bahamas